Jeff Talman (born 1954 in Greensburg, Pennsylvania) is a contemporary artist who works in a variety of media including sound, light, video installation, sculpture, graphics and photography.

Career
Talman graduated with BA and MA degrees in Music Composition from the City College of New York. He later studied at Columbia University, where he began using computers for sound composition in 1984. He also taught and conducted orchestras at both schools. He has lived in New York City since 1976.

Though trained as a composer of chamber and orchestral music, Talman switched modes of presentation after an extended stay in Europe. His repeated visits to the Cathedral of St. Vitus in Prague in 1996-97 provided important insight regarding architectural sound. Talman determined that the ambient sound of a space, the Room Tone, is sufficient to activate the resonance of the space, which provides unique sonic perceptual data of the site.

After two years of experimentation with recordings of spatial sound, Talman’s installation “Vanishing Point 1.1” (1999) was presented at St. Paul’s Chapel at Columbia University. This work featured the site’s resonance, extracted from a recording of its ambient room tone, amplified, treated as a compositional element and returned to the space in multi-channel sound. Since then Talman has produced numerous works that feature this unique resonance-composition and feedback technique. The installations, at times, also incorporate resonant sculpture, video projection and other visual objects.

Installation sites have included Cathedral Square (Domplatte) in Cologne, Germany, St. James Cathedral in Chicago, the Bavarian Forest, a wind turbine site in Åland, Finland, the MIT Media Lab, The Kitchen, Eyebeam, bitforms gallery in New York City and others.

Awards
Talman is a 2006 recipient of a John Simon Guggenheim Foundation Fellowship in Sound Art and a 2003 recipient of a New York Foundation for the Arts Fellowship in Computer Art. He has been awarded numerous residencies including those at Yaddo, the Liguria Study Center in Bogliasco, Italy, the MacDowell Colony, the Virginia Center for the Creative Arts, the Oberpfälzer Künstlerhaus in Schwandorf, Germany and the Künstlerhaus Krems in Krems, Austria.

References

Bennett, Paul. "Jeff Talman: Sonic Room." WIRED Magazine, October 2000. https://www.wired.com/wired/archive/8.10/eword_pr.html, accessed Dec. 3, 2007 (text only).
Brungard, Bond. “Field of Themes.” The Poughkeepsie Journal, Sept 29, 2005.
http://cityguide.pojonews.com/fe/DayTrips/stories/dt_the_fields_sculpture_park.asp, accessed Dec. 3, 2007.
Donath, Judith, Ed. "This Voice Anywhere." http://identity.media.mit.edu/voice.html, accessed Dec. 3, 2007.
Dunning, Jennifer. "Seemingly Innocent, Behind the Grand Gestures." New York Times, August 19, 1997.		
Ed. "I sonnigrammi di Jeff Talman." http://www.neural.it/, April 11, 2002.
http://neural.it/2002/04/sonograms-of-jeff-talman/, accessed Nov. 7, 2017.
Ed. “Kathedralen aus Klang” (w/ image). Szene Hamburg, July 2004.
Ed. “Klänge, die aus der Stille kommen.” Kölner Stadt-Anzeiger, Nr. 254, Friday, October 29, 2004.
Ed. (wur) “Klangwolke, ein Zauberstein und transformierte Bäume.” Bayerwald Echo, September 24, 2006.
Ed. (KStA) “Der Dom alleine tut’s nicht.” Kölner Stadt-Anzeiger. Thursday, November 4, 2004.
Ed. (wbe) “Grundschüler auf den Spuren der Klänge.” Bayerwald Echo, September 30, 2006.
Ed. (sb) “Laute Stille des Raumes: Unhörbare Töne werden hörbar.” Mittelbayrische Zeitung, July 3, 2003.		
Ed. Persönlich: “Westerwelle outet sich als Fan der Art.” Kölnische Rundschau, Nr. 254, Oct 29, 2004.
Ed. (pm) “Sound-Installation von Jeff Talman gelauscht.” Chamer Zeitung, September 30, 2006.
Ed. Tagesschau. WDR, National Television, Germany, 5 PM, Oct 28, 2004.
Ed. Yaddo. http://yaddo.org/yaddo/artistslinks.shtml, click on “Media/Performance Artists” or on “Composers.” Accessed Dec. 3, 2007. 
Gouveia, Georgette. “Peekskill Exhibit Explores Spirituality.” The Journal News, Peekskill, NY, June 9, 2006.
Gladstone, Valerie. “European Artists Return to Church.” New York Times, July 15, 2007, International Herald Tribune, July 24, 2007.
Griffiths, Paul. "A Building With a Song In Its Heart and Vaults." New York Times, September 24, 1999.
Grueneissen, Peter. Soundspaces – Tönraum. Birkhauser, August 2003.
Lahmann-Lammert, Silve. “Jeff Talman” (radio interview w/ sound). Abend Journal, NDR, Hamburg, Germany, 90.3 FM, July 9, 2004.
Lewin, Emanuel. “Sonalumina-13.” Exhibition guide, Art Interactive, Cambridge, MA, Sept 13, 2004.
Millis, Christopher. “Getting into the Act.” The Boston Phoenix, November 28, 2002. 
http://www.bostonphoenix.com/boston/arts/art/documents/02557177.htm, accessed Feb. 25, 2014.
Morgan, Robert C., “The Rise of the New Media Arts.” bitforms artists catalogue, bitforms, New York, NY, September 2006.
Norrlund, Sofia. “Vindkraftverk blir konst.” Nya Åland, Mariehamn, Åland, Finland, June 17, 2005.
Paldan, Salme. “Kökar – Close to Nature.” Arsis: Journal of the Arts Council of Finland, March 2005.
Poscharsky-Ziegler, Anastasia. “Irisches Gras und amerikanische Ironie.” Der Neue Tag, July 3, 2003.
Poser, Jessica. “Reviews: Jeff Talman @ Art Interactive.” Big, Red and Shiny, Oct 19, 2004. http://www.bigredandshiny.com/cgi-bin/archive.pl; see link under Launched October 14; accessed Dec. 3, 2007.
Raab, Harald. “30 Sekunden der Stille werden Hörbar gemacht.” Die Mittelbayerische Zeitung, July 10, 2003.
Raab Harald. “The Song of the Space and Its Creative Energy.” Sonalumina-13 exhibition guide, Art Interactive, Cambridge, MA, translated by Greta Byrum, Sept 13, 2004.
Sherman, Mary. “Visual Arts; Works exude power by hiding high-tech.” Boston Herald, November 24, 2002. 
Staretz, David. “Wolkenkuckucksheime; Wenn Kathedralen seufzen.”  Morgen – Kultur, Niederösterreich, Europa, 5/06, St. Pölten, Austria; September 2006.
Wilhelm, Don. “Jeff Talman: Sound Artist on the Frontier.” Talent In Motion, Volume IX, Issue I, June 2006. http://timmag.com/v9i1/art.php3, accesses Dec. 3, 2007.

External links
Artist's Website
Video Documentation

1954 births
Living people
People from Greensburg, Pennsylvania
City College of New York alumni